Pawan Kumar (born 1 July 1990) is an Indian professional footballer who plays as a goalkeeper for East Bengal in the Indian Super League.

Career

Youth and early career
Born in Gurdaspur, Punjab, Kumar has played with several I-League clubs like JCT, Air India, and Salgaocar. While with JCT, Kumar led the side to the 2010 Durand Cup final where his side lost 1–0 to Chirag United at the Ambedkar Stadium. Also while with the club, Kumar was one of five players sent to England to train with the Wolverhampton Wanderers Academy for a week as part of a partnership Wolves had with JCT. Then, for the 2011–2012 season, after JCT disbanded, Kumar played with Air India, another I-League, side for the season. 

Then, for the 2012–13 season, Kumar played with Salgaocar where he found himself as the #2 behind Karanjit Singh. Kumar only played in one match while with the club against Sporting Goa on 20 March 2013 in which he came on as a 63rd-minute substitute after Karanjit Singh was red carded; Salgaocar lost the match 1–3.

Bengaluru FC
On 21 July 2013, during the launch of new direct-entry I-League club, Bengaluru FC, Kumar was announced as one of the players signed on to the club for the new season. Kumar then made his debut for Bengaluru in the club's very first I-League match ever against Mohun Bagan A.C. at the Bangalore Football Stadium in which he started and played the full match as the match ended 1–1.

Mumbai
In December 2015, Pawan joined Mumbai F.C. for 2015–16 I-League.

Career statistics

Club

Honours

Club

Chennaiyin FC
 Indian Super League: 2015 Champions
 Indian Super League: 2017-18 Champions

References

1990 births
Living people
Indian footballers
JCT FC players
Air India FC players
Salgaocar FC players
Bengaluru FC players
Association football goalkeepers
Footballers from Punjab, India
I-League players
Indian Super League players
Chennaiyin FC players
Mumbai FC players
NorthEast United FC players
Jamshedpur FC players